Samuel Lustenberger (born 20 January 1985 in Lucerne, Switzerland) is a naturalized Dominican footballer of Swiss descent, who currently plays as midfielder. He is the cousin of fellow footballer Claudio Lustenberger.

International career 
Lustenberger has lived in the Dominican Republic when he was between 2 and 15 years old. He played his first match for the Dominican on the 24 March 2013 against Haiti.

References 

 

1985 births
Living people
Sportspeople from Lucerne
Swiss men's footballers
Dominican Republic people of Swiss descent
Dominican Republic footballers
Association football forwards
Liga Dominicana de Fútbol players
Cibao FC players
Dominican Republic international footballers